A shroud is a burial cloth.

Shroud or The Shroud may also refer to:

Arts and entertainment
 Shroud (comics), a fictional superhero in the Marvel Comics universe
 Shroud (novel), by John Banville
 Shroud (gamer) (born 1994)
 Shroud, fictional villain Fumine Sonozaki in the Japanese TV series Kamen Rider W
 Shroud, a term in Magic: The Gathering
 The Shroud (fairy tale), a story from Grimms' Fairy Tales
 "The Shroud", an episode of the television series Stargate SG-1 (season 10)
 "The Shroud" (The Outer Limits) an episode of the television series The Outer Limits 
 The Shroud, a mysterious foe from the computer game Pariah

Science and technology
 Barrel shroud, a firearm component surrounding the barrel
 Muzzle shroud, a firearm component surrounding the muzzle
 Shroud (computing), to obfuscate code, i.e., make it difficult for humans to understand
 Shroud (sailing), a rope that gives support to the masts in sailing ships

See also 
Gas mantle